Matthew Ben Longstaff (born 21 March 2000) is an English professional footballer who plays as a midfielder for  Premier League club Newcastle United.

Club career

Newcastle United
Longstaff made his first-team debut for Newcastle United on 28 August 2019, starting against Leicester City in the EFL Cup. He scored in the 72nd minute of his Premier League debut, in a 1–0 win against Manchester United on 6 October. The stunning strike outside the box was later voted as Premier League Goal of the Month. He then went on to score in the reverse fixture at Old Trafford, the opening goal in a 4–1 defeat.

Following the expiration of his contract at the end of the 2019–20 season, Longstaff signed a new two-year contract with Newcastle United on 22 August 2020.

Aberdeen (loan)
On 27 August 2021, Longstaff joined Scottish club Aberdeen on a season-long loan.

On 26 December 2021, Longstaff was recalled early by his parent club Newcastle United, having only featured five times for Aberdeen.

Mansfield Town (loan)
On 31 January 2022, Longstaff joined EFL League Two side Mansfield Town on loan for the remainder of the season.

Colchester United (loan)
On 1 September 2022, Longstaff joined EFL League Two side Colchester United on a short-term loan. He returned to Newcastle on 1 January 2023 following a knee injury.

International career
On 8 November 2019, Longstaff received his first international call up to the England U20 side. He made his debut as a substitute during a 4–0 win over Portugal on 14 November 2019.

Personal life
Longstaff was born in Rotherham, South Yorkshire and raised in North Shields, Tyne and Wear. Longstaff went to school at John Spence Community High School. Longstaff was a boyhood Newcastle United supporter and his older brother Sean is also a footballer for Newcastle United. Their father David is a former Great Britain ice hockey player, who featured over 100 times for the national side, and is still active as coach for the Whitley Warriors. David is the cousin of former England international Alan Thompson. They are not related to former Newcastle academy player Luis Longstaff.

Career statistics

Honours
Individual
Premier League Goal of the Month: October 2019

References

External links
Profile at the Newcastle United F.C. website

2000 births
Living people
Footballers from Rotherham
Sportspeople from North Shields
Footballers from Tyne and Wear
English footballers
Association football midfielders
Newcastle United F.C. players
Premier League players
England youth international footballers
Aberdeen F.C. players
Mansfield Town F.C. players
Scottish Professional Football League players